John L. McClellan (1896–1977) was a U.S. Senator from Arkansas from 1943 to 1977.

Senator McClellan may also refer to:

Abraham McClellan (Tennessee politician) (1789–1866), Tennessee State Senate
Robert H. McClellan (1823–1902), New York State Senate
Samuel R. McClellan (1806–1890), Wisconsin State Senate

See also
Senator McClelland (disambiguation)